The British Rail Derby Lightweight diesel multiple units, were the first such trains to be built en-masse for British Railways. The units were built at BR's Derby Works from 1954 to 1955. The units were built in various formations, including 12 power-twin 2-car units, 84 power-trailer 2-car units, and four 4-car units. The two single car units were originally built as a two-car unit and then split two years later when demand came about.

Body framing was extruded and riveted together. Panelling was welded into continuous sheets and riveted to the frame. Luggage racks were light alloy. The floors had 2 layers of flameproof hardboard, covered with linoleum. To reduce noise and condensation, the inside structure and undersides were sprayed with asbestos. Lighting was by 60-watt, 24-volt lamps charged by belt driven dynamos. Heating was oil fired. Standard mild steel bogies ran on Timken roller bearings.

Contemporaneous with these units was the unique Battery Electric Multiple Unit.

Operations
The first units were introduced on services around the West Riding of Yorkshire, namely Leeds to Bradford and Harrogate services from 14 June 1954. Subsequent units were introduced onto services in West Cumbria, Lincolnshire, Norfolk, Newcastle to Middlesbrough, Edinburgh to Glasgow and, later, Birmingham to Sutton Coldfield, Bletchley to Buckingham and Banbury, and East London lines services. They were also the last units to run on the Anglesey Central Railway which closed to public traffic in 1964.

These units were an outstanding success, helping to reduce the operating costs of branchlines. Initially they also attracted many more passengers. Between February and October 1956 on the London Midland, they carried 800,000 more passengers than steam in the same period of 1955. The largest increase was 434% (4,772 passengers) on the Buckingham-Banbury line (from 13 August), followed by Birmingham-Lichfield 178% (from 5 March), Bury-Bacup 152% (from 6 February), Llandudno-Blaenau Ffestiniog 39% (from 5 March) and Manchester-Buxton 38% (from 8 October). As such, British Railways ordered many more DMU vehicles from various builders over the next decade, thus helping to eliminate steam locomotives. However, as these units were non-standard compared to other later DMU vehicles, they were subject to early retirement. The last units were withdrawn from normal traffic in 1969.

Formations
Four different sorts of formation were created from the 217 cars built of this type, as follows:

Power Twins

Power Trailers

Four Car Units

Single Car Units

79683 was left over as a spare DTCL, and took the place of 79649 in 1957, when this was converted into a special saloon on diagram 565. It was later renumbered 999510 in the departmental saloon series and was eventually scrapped in 1981.

In 1962 three of the power twin units were converted to power trailer units, when 79191–79193 were rebuilt as DTCL vehicles and renumbered 79633–79635.

Powertrain

Power Twins 79000+79500 to 79007+79507
 Engine: Two BUT (Leyland) 125 bhp
 Transmission: Hydraulic, Lysholm-Smith (Leyland) torque converter
 Coupling code: Red triangle

Remainder of the fleet
 Engine: Two BUT (AEC) 150 bhp
 Transmission: Mechanical
 Coupling code: Yellow diamond

Departmental Use
A number of cars from these units were subsequently transferred to departmental (non-revenue earning) use after withdrawal from normal service:
 79018 + 79612 were rebuilt as an ultrasonic test train based at Reading, numbered 975007 + 975008. Replaced by unit 901001.
 79900 was rebuilt as test coach "Iris", based at Bletchley, numbered 975010. Later transferred to the BR Research Division at the Railway Technical Centre at Derby, for its last few years in traffic, it was repainted into original BR Green livery. Replaced by unit 901002.
 79185 was taken into departmental use for brake trials, numbered 975012. It was scrapped in 1970.
 79250 and 79252 were taken into departmental use as staff messrooms, numbered 975013 and 975014. They were scrapped in 1978 and 1982 respectively.
 79649, the inspection saloon mentioned above, took its place in the departmental series as 999510.

Preservation

Thanks to their extended life in departmental service, one 2-car unit and a single car unit survive in preservation on the Ecclesbourne Valley Railway, the former following a high-profile campaign.

See also
British Rail BEMU – a power-trailer two car EMU based on the Derby Lightweight DMU design.

References

External links

Derby Lightweight
Train-related introductions in 1954